George Hatiras is a Canadian electronic musician and DJ. He is most noted as a two-time Juno Award winner for Dance Recording of the Year, winning at the Juno Awards of 2002 for "Spaced Invader" and at the Juno Awards of 2006 for "Spanish Fly".

External links

References

Juno Award for Dance Recording of the Year winners
Canadian dance musicians
Canadian electronic musicians
Canadian DJs
Living people
Year of birth missing (living people)